"Wildflowers" is a song recorded by Canadian country music artist Cassandra Vasik. It was released in 1992 as the fourth single from her debut album, Wildflowers. It peaked at number 10 on the RPM Country Tracks chart in August 1992.

Chart performance

References

1991 songs
1992 singles
Cassandra Vasik songs
Epic Records singles
Songs written by Tim Thorney
Songs written by Erica Ehm
Songs about flowers